Jean-Julien Rojer and Horia Tecău were the defending champions, but withdrew before their first-round match because of Tecău's right forearm injury.
Marius Copil and Adrian Ungur won the title, defeating Nicholas Monroe and Artem Sitak in the final, 3–6, 7–5, [17–15].

Seeds

Draw

Draw

References
 Main Draw

BRD Nastase Tiriac Trophyandnbsp;- Doubles
2015 Doubles